Olivier Rommens (3 February 1995) is a Belgian professional football player who plays as a midfielder for Nõmme Kalju in Estonian Meistriliiga.

Career

Jong PSV
Rommens is a youth exponent from PSV Eindhoven, who he joined in 2006 together with his brother, Philippe. Before, they had both started out at local club KFC Ranst, and moved to Lierse SK, where they played for four years before starting at the youth academy of PSV. 

Rommens made his professional debut as Jong PSV player in the second division on 9 August 2014 against Achilles '29. He started in the first eleven at the first fixture of the 2014–15 season. He scored his first goal for the club in a 2–0 home win.

NAC Breda
On 25 June 2016, it was announced that Rommens had signed a two-year contract with Eerste Divisie side NAC Breda. On 30 December 2018, his contract with dissolved.

TOP Oss
On 4 January 2019, Rommens joined his brother Philippe by signing a two-and-a-half year contract with TOP Oss. He made his debut for the club on 18 January as a starter in a 3–0 away loss to FC Den Bosch.

Rommens scored his first goal for TOP Oss on 13 January 2020 after an assist by Cas Peters. His team eventually lost 3–1 away to Jong AZ.

FK Sūduva 
In July 2021 he signed with Lithuanian A Lyga club FK Sūduva. In 7 August 2021, he scored in the domestic league against FK Panevėžys.

Nõmme Kalju
In February 2023 he signed Estonian Meistriliiga club Nõmme Kalju.

References

1995 births
Footballers from Antwerp Province
Living people
Belgian footballers
Association football midfielders
Jong PSV players
NAC Breda players
TOP Oss players
FK Sūduva Marijampolė players
Nõmme Kalju FC players
Eerste Divisie players
A Lyga players

Belgian expatriate footballers
Expatriate footballers in the Netherlands
Belgian expatriate sportspeople in the Netherlands
Expatriate footballers in Lithuania
Belgian expatriate sportspeople in Lithuania
Expatriate footballers in Estonia
Belgian expatriate sportspeople in Estonia